Daniel Hopwood is the president of the British Institute of Interior Design and a judge on the BBC's amateur design programme The Great Interior Design Challenge along with Kelly Hoppen.

Hopwood graduated with a degree in architecture and then joined the The Prince's Foundation. He has run his company 'Studio Hopwood' for the past twenty years. Previous to his BBC work he had presented and judged the Channel 4 series Britain’s Best Homes.

Bibliography
 
Co-authored with Sophie Robinson, Daniel Hopwood and Katherine Sorrell

References

Living people
British interior designers
British television presenters
Year of birth missing (living people)
Place of birth missing (living people)